Keith Stanley Windon (2 October 1917 – 14 February 1998) was a rugby union player who represented Australia.

Windon, a flanker, was born in Randwick, New South Wales and claimed a total of 3 international rugby caps for Australia.

References

Australian rugby union players
Australia international rugby union players
1917 births
1998 deaths
Rugby union flankers
Rugby union players from Sydney